Mahoning County High School is a public community school in the city of Youngstown, Ohio, United States. They offer high school diplomas for students or adults wanting to get back on track with academics.

References

High schools in Mahoning County, Ohio
Education in Youngstown, Ohio
Public high schools in Ohio